Yawhen Marozaw (born 17 April 1995) is a Belarusian professional footballer who plays for Yuni Minsk.

References

External links 
 
 

1995 births
Living people
Sportspeople from Vitebsk
Belarusian footballers
Association football defenders
FC BATE Borisov players
FC Torpedo Minsk players
FC Chist players
FC Molodechno players